David Allen Robertson is a State Representative currently serving in the Massachusetts House representing parts of Tewksbury and Wilmington. He has been serving since 2019 and is a member of the Democratic Party.

Robertson is a lifelong resident of Tewksbury, Massachusetts, one of the townships he represents in the state legislature. According to his campaign website, Robertson graduated from the University of Massachusetts, Amherst, double majoring in economics and political science. He previously served in the office of former State Representative James R. Miceli.

Career 
Robertson served ten years in the office of former State Representative James R. Miceli, starting with an internship. Robertson later served as a constituent affairs aide, a legislative researcher, and finally Miceli's Chief of Staff. Robertson won a five-way Democratic primary to become the Democratic nominee in the general election on November 6, 2018. He won the general election with 48.2% of the vote, to his opponents 43.4% and 8.3%.

Committees 
Robertson currently serves on the Joint Committee on Environment, Natural Resources and Agriculture, the Joint Committee on Labor and Workforce Development, the Joint Committee on Telecommunications, Utilities and Energy, and the Joint Committee on Veterans and Federal Affairs.

See also
 2019–2020 Massachusetts legislature

References

People from Tewksbury, Massachusetts
Living people
University of Massachusetts Amherst College of Social and Behavioral Sciences alumni
Democratic Party members of the Massachusetts House of Representatives
Year of birth missing (living people)
21st-century American politicians